Zoldo Alto is a town in the province of Belluno, Veneto, Italy. It's a frazione of Val di Zoldo since 2016. It is noted for its ski resort. A boarding school was established in the 1950s which was used by the children during spring and autumn and senior citizens during the winter months. On 31 January 1991 the municipality was affected by the Ru Duelle Roe landslide, which affected the right flank of the Ru delle Roe stream in the dolomitic slopes of Cime di San Sebastiano and Moiazza. The region is a producer of fresh and mature cheeses.

References

External links

 Val Zoldana travel guide on Wikivoyage

Cities and towns in Veneto